Frayed may refer to:

 Frayed (novella), an original novella based on British science fiction television series Doctor Who
 Frayed (TV series), a 2019 comedy series for the ABC in Australia and Sky UK in Great Britain

See also 
 Frayed Knights, a 2011 3D indie computer RPG for Windows